Joe's Xmasage is a compilation album featuring music recorded by Frank Zappa from 1962 to 1965. It was released in December 2005. It is the third in a series of releases put together by archivist Joe Travers which started with Joe's Corsage (2004).

The album is a mix of recordings at Pal Recording Studio (also known as Studio Z), live tracks and field recordings. It includes a longer version of "The Uncle Frankie Show" which was originally released on the Mystery Disc.

Track listing
All tracks written, composed and arranged by Frank Zappa.

References

External links
Joe's XMASage at Zappa.com

Compilation albums published posthumously
Frank Zappa compilation albums
2005 compilation albums